Vendeta is a 2011 Czech thriller film directed by Miroslav Ondruš.

Plot 
Film tells story of a man whose daughter was raped and murdered by her classmates. He decides to take revenge. This leads to his confrontation with another man who disagree with his deeds.

Cast 
Ondřej Vetchý - Pochman - The main protagonist. His daughter Hanka was raped and murdered by three boys. He wants to revenge and decides to kill them. 
Oldřich Kaiser - Mazura - He acts as a main antagonist toward the end of film. He is a forester who finds out about Pochman's revenge. He disagree with it and so he tries to protect boys.
Igor Chmela - Chladima - A cop who is bribed by Pochman.
Marek Taclík - Novotný - Another cop. He is also bribed by Pochman. He is not sure that it's reasonable to help Pochman.
Lucie Šteflová - Hanka - Pochman's daughter. She was murdered by her classmates.
 Ondřej Havel - Tomáš - A leader of boys who killed Hanka. He is proud of it.
Václav Vostárek - David - A boy who participated in rape and murder of Hanka. He is the only who feels remorse for what he did.
Daniel Novák - Honza - The third boy who participated.

Reception 
Reviews:
Kamil Fila, Aktuálně.cz, November 1, 2011 40%
Tereza Spáčilová, iDNES.cz, November 22, 2011 70%
Karel Ryška, MovieZone.cz, November 23, 2011 
Alena Prokopová, Alenčin blog, November 21, 2011
František Fuka, FFFilm, November 18, 2011 70%

References

External links 
Internet Movie Database
Czech and Slovak film database (Czech)
Kinobox site (Czech)

2011 thriller films
Films about revenge
2010s Czech-language films
2011 films
Czech thriller films